The String Quartets is an album of contemporary classical music by American composer and saxophonist/multi-instrumentalist John Zorn performed by Mark Feldman, Erik Friedlander, Joyce Hammann and Lois Martin. The piece Kol Nidre is a tune from Zorn's Masada songbook.

Reception
The Allmusic review by Joslyn Layne awarded the album 4 stars stating "Maybe Zorn's genius isn't that he creates entirely unique music, but he certainly has an ear for great musical ideas, gleaned from his years of deep listening. And so, while these compositions may not be landmarks among string quartet works, they are exceedingly well done".

Track listing
All compositions by John Zorn.
 "Cat O'Nine Tails" – 13:44 
 "The Dead Man" – 12:27
 "Memento Mori" – 28:57
 "Kol Nidre" – 8:32

Personnel
Mark Feldman – violin 
Erik Friedlander – cello 
Joyce Hammann – violin 
Lois Martin – viola

References

1999 albums
Albums produced by John Zorn
John Zorn albums
Tzadik Records albums